Joe Corrie (13 May 1894 – 13 November 1968) was a Scottish miner, poet and playwright best known for his radical, working class plays.

He was born in Slamannan, Stirlingshire in 1894. His family moved to Cardenden in the Fife coalfield when Corrie was still an infant and he started work at the pits in 1908. He died in Edinburgh in 1968.

Shortly after the First World War, Corrie started writing. His articles, sketches, short stories and poems were published in prominent socialist newspapers and journals, including Forward and The Miner.

Corrie's volumes of poetry include The Image O' God and Other Poems (1927), Rebel Poems (1932) and Scottish Pride and Other Poems (1955). T. S. Eliot wrote "Not since Burns has the voice of Scotland spoken with such authentic lyric note".

He turned to writing plays during the General Strike in 1926. His one-act plays and sketches were performed by the Bowhill Players, an amateur company of miners who performed to raise money for local soup kitchens. The company operated professionally as the Fife Miner Players in 1928-31 under the management of comedian and theatrical agent, Hugh Ogilvie. Corrie's first play, Hogmanay was published by the Fife Miners' Reform Union. His full-length play, In Time O'Strife, depicting the General Strike's effect on the Fife mining community, toured Fife mining villages and musical halls all over Scotland. Described by critic Alan Riach as showing examplary 'defiance of the spirit'.

Corrie wrote at last six plays about Robert Burns: the full-length "Robert Burns" and five one-acts, "The Rake o’Mauchline," "A Man’s A Man or Burns Amang the Gentry," "There Was a Lad," "Clarinda, and "Robert Burns and His Highland Mary," as well as a popular radio adaptation of “Tam o’Shanter” that was performed and broadcast repeatedly for over forty years, and at least half a dozen radio programs for Burns Nights.

Corrie wrote a number of plays for groups who took part in the Scottish Community Drama Association's annual competitive festivals. Winning plays included Martha (1935), And So To War (1936) and Hewers of Coal (1937).

Corrie's commitment to naturalism invited strong criticism from the Scottish theatrical establishment in his day and caused him to feel disconnected from other Scottish writers. His work was staged professionally by Scottish National Players and the Citizens' Theatre, Glasgow. Posthumously, agitprop theatre group, 7:84 republished In Time O' Strife alongside a collection of writing and poems after their 1982 revival, which Alan Riach said was met with 'new acclaim'.

The Corrie Centre community provision in Cardenden was named after Corrie in 1985.

Corrie also wrote songs and many of his poems have been set to music. Maid of Kenmore was recorded by Robert Wilson. Calum Kennedy recorded Kirsteen. Battlefield Band recorded settings by Alan Reid of The Image O God, Miners Wives and I Am the Common Man. In 2013, The Joe Corrie Project: Cage Load of Men, a collection of poems set to contemporary and traditional music, was released.

The 2012 feature film, The Happy Lands, was inspired by In Time O' Strife, being set in the same fictional village of Carhill.

In 2019, the University of St Andrews released a biography of Corrie, as well as a guide to his archive and several academic essays in a new website marking the 50th anniversary of his death. This includes papers by Robert Crawford, Tom Hubbard, Willie Hershaw, Malcolm Petrie, Gavin Bowd, Sarah Leith, and Paul Malgrati.

Further reading
 Hubbard, Tom (2018), "From Montsou to Bowhill: Joe Corrie's Antecedents", in Hubbard, Tom (2022), Invitation to the Voyage: Scotland, Europe and Literature, Rymour, pp. 76 - 83,

References

1894 births
1968 deaths
Scottish dramatists and playwrights
Scottish miners
People from Falkirk (council area)
People associated with Fife
People from Cardenden
Scottish socialists
Proletarian literature
20th-century Scottish poets
Scottish male poets
20th-century British dramatists and playwrights